Max Rene Valentino Mackintosh (May 13, 1930 – March 23, 2011), better known by his stage name Max Woiski Jr., was a Surinamese singer and guitarist. He was the son of Max Woiski Sr. and father of singer Lils Mackintosh.

Career
Woiski Jr. was brought to Amsterdam by his father, when he needed a guitarist in his orchestra. When his father left to Mallorca to open a club there, he went his own way. Woiski Jr. mainly performed with his orchestra in his own club La Tropicana in Amsterdam. They mainly made Latin American music. He went on to have hits with the songs Rijst met kouseband (Rice with garter) in 1962 and Je bent nog niet gelukkig met een mooie vrouw (You are not happy yet with a beautiful woman) in 1963, which was a cover of If You Wanna Be Happy. Around this time he was very successful in the Netherlands and won an Edison Award. After a business conflict, four members left his band and founded their own.

Discography
Albums
Woiski A Go Go
Max Woiski Junior at the Tropicana, Amsterdam
De Grootste Successen Van Max Woiski Jr. (1970)
Ritmo Tropical (2011)

References

1930 births
2011 deaths
People from Paramaribo
20th-century Surinamese male singers
Surinamese emigrants to the Netherlands